Gerald N. Felando (born December 29, 1934) is an American politician in the state of California. He served in the California State Assembly as a Republican from 1978 to 1992.

References

1934 births
Living people
Republican Party members of the California State Assembly
20th-century American politicians